The Mayor of Vibo Valentia is an elected politician who, along with the Vibo Valentia's City Council, is accountable for the strategic government of Vibo Valentia in Calabria, Italy. The current Mayor is Maria Limardo, a centre-right independent, who took office on 3 June 2019.

Overview
According to the Italian Constitution, the Mayor of Vibo Valentia is member of the City Council.

The Mayor is elected by the population of Vibo Valentia, who also elects the members of the City Council, controlling the Mayor's policy guidelines and is able to enforce his resignation by a motion of no confidence. The Mayor is entitled to appoint and release the members of his government.

Since 1995 the Mayor is elected directly by Vibo Valentia's electorate: in all mayoral elections in Italy in cities with a population higher than 15,000 the voters express a direct choice for the mayor or an indirect choice voting for the party of the candidate's coalition. If no candidate receives at least 50% of votes, the top two candidates go to a second round after two weeks. The election of the City Council is based on a direct choice for the candidate with a preference vote: the candidate with the majority of the preferences is elected. The number of the seats for each party is determined proportionally.

Italian Republic (since 1946)

City Council election (1946-1994)

From 1946 to 1994, the Mayor of Vibo Valentia was elected by the City's Council.

Direct election (since 1994)
Since 1994, under provisions of new local administration law, the Mayor of Vibo Valentia is chosen by direct election.

References

External links
 

Vibo Valentia
 
Politics of Calabria
Vibo Valentia